Little Boy is a 2015 World War II war-drama film directed by Alejandro Gómez Monteverde. The screenplay is by Monteverde and Pepe Portillo, and the film was produced by Eduardo Verástegui and Leo Severino, and edited by Joan Sobel and Fernando Villena. The film stars Jakob Salvati, Emily Watson, David Henrie, Cary-Hiroyuki Tagawa, Michael Rapaport, Ben Chaplin, Eduardo Verástegui, Ted Levine, Abraham Benrubi, and Tom Wilkinson. The title is a reference to Little Boy, the code name for the atomic bomb dropped on Hiroshima, as well as a reference to the main character Pepper's height. The film was co-produced by Metanoia Films and Santa Fé Films and was released on April 24, 2015, by Open Road Films. It was released on DVD and Blu-ray on August 18, 2015, by Universal Pictures Home Entertainment. The film received negative reviews from mainstream critics and earned $17 million on a $20 million budget. An Indian adaptation of the film, titled Tubelight and starring Salman Khan in the lead role, opened to mixed reviews in 2017.

Plot
In the seaside town of O'Hare, California, an 8-year-old boy who is small for his age, Pepper Flynt Busbee (Jakob Salvati), has a very close relationship with  James, his loving father, which begins from the very moment he is born when his father cradles him in his arms and notices how small he is. When Pepper asks a doctor if he has dwarfism, the doctor tells him, "For now, Pepper, let's just say you're a 'little boy'," this expression would become Pepper's nickname. He would learn to despise those two words and always make a problem when someone would call out his nickname.

However, when World War II begins, Pepper's older brother is declared ineligible for military service because of flat feet and their father joins in his place, which devastates Pepper. Not long after his father leaves for war, Pepper hears the Bible verse, "Truly I tell you, if you have faith as small as a mustard seed, you can say to this mountain, ‘Move from here to there,’ and it will move" (Matthew 17:20), he becomes determined to get enough faith to bring his father home.  Nevertheless, as his friend and mentor Father Oliver tells him, faith is useless to anyone who harbors hatred. Father Oliver tells Pepper to befriend a Japanese man named Hashimoto.

At first, the anti-Japanese sentiment Pepper has internalized – which has become prevalent in his society – makes him hesitant to follow this advice, but as he gets to know Hashimoto, he begins to value their friendship and learns from Hashimoto to stand up to those who bully him about his height.  Father Oliver gave Pepper a list of tasks to complete. When Pepper's father is reported missing in action, Pepper's mother (Emily Watson) struggles to keep her family together in the face of these overwhelming hardships. His brother London, and Sam – one of the townspeople that lost a son – go to Hashimoto's home and attack him one night, leading to his being hospitalized. London is initially arrested, but Hashimoto decides not to press charges and he is released.

An Army representative brings the news that Pepper's father has been killed and is buried in the Philippines. Hashimoto goes to the memorial service at the O'Hare Cemetery to pay his respects. Pepper and Hashimoto sit on a bench and discuss their mutual losses of family and believing in something. Pepper goes back to the cemetery to visit his father's grave and place the list on top of his grave marker. Pepper and his mother go to the town doctor; Dr. Fox tries to hit on her and invite himself over to the house that evening under the pretext of talking about what could possibly be the cause of Pepper's short stature.

Later that day, a spokesperson from the Army arrives to tell her that her husband didn't die after all. The man that actually died had stolen Pepper's father's boots, with his dog tags attached to the laces, when he fell after being shot, so he was misidentified as Pepper's father.  The family leaves town to visit James in the hospital and Pepper takes him the boots that James had been eyeing for some time, which Pepper bought for him after he went off to war. Upon arriving, they realize that James has suffered from mild amnesia due to an injury to the head. However, Pepper calls his father by his longtime nickname, "partner", and presents him his gift. James holds the boots, then hugs Pepper and touches the faces of the rest of his family. They all kneel around his chair and share a group hug, before driving him back to O'Hare.

Cast 

Jakob Salvati as Pepper Flynt Busbee
Emily Watson as Emma Busbee
David Henrie as London Busbee
Cary-Hiroyuki Tagawa as Hashimoto
Michael Rapaport as James Busbee
Ben Chaplin as Ben Eagle
Ted Levine as Sam
Ali Landry as Ava
Kevin James as Dr. Fox
Tom Wilkinson as Fr. Oliver
Toby Huss as Colonel Bob
Abraham Benrubi as	Teacup
Kelly Greyson as Tyra
Sam Kindseth as Ronnie
Eduardo Verástegui as Fr. Crispin
James DuMont as Harvey
Candice Azzara as Bertha 
Lukas Behnken as Leonard Rice
Mary Stein as Martha
Eijiro Ozaki as Masao Kume
Winston James Francis as Bukha
Masami Kosaka as Commander Tokyo Joe
Theodora Greece as	Eliza

Production 
On August 4, 2011, it was announced that Metanoia Films would produce the film, with Ben Chaplin and Emily Watson joining the cast. On August 6, 2011, Kevin James, David Henrie and Jakob Salvati joined the cast. On June 20, 2014, Open Road Films picked up distribution rights to the film. On July 2, 2014, it was announced that the film would be released on February 27, 2015.

On April 22, 2015, producer and star Eduardo Verástegui told the Catholic News Agency, "It was going to be a very, very difficult film to produce, but at the same time we were in love with the story which is about believing in the impossible." It was clear to Verástegui that it would be very difficult to produce an independent film totally outside the system. More than 1,000 children were auditioned for the role of Pepper. Eventually, Jakob Salvati won the role at seven years of age, even though he had only acted on television. During the film, Salvati was frequently found praying by himself that the scene would go well. Actor David Henrie was seeking such a film as this one after emerging as a Disney star, and in the process of returning to the Catholic Church. Henrie told BreatheCast.com that the film's producers were instrumental in his conversion. "I will forever be grateful for Little Boy because it was the film that saved my life," he said. "The theme really spoke to my heart in a big way. I think it's a very foundational element and theme that everyone deals with, do you put your faith in yourself to find your own existence or do you put your theme in something bigger than you?"

Release
The film was theatrically released on April 24, 2015 by Open Road Films and was released on DVD and Blu-ray on August 18, 2015 by Universal Pictures Home Entertainment.

Reception
Little Boy has received negative reviews from mainstream critics. On Rotten Tomatoes, the film has a rating of 24% based on 54 reviews from critics, with an average rating of 4.43/10. The website's critical consensus reads, "Well-meaning but manipulative on a horrifically misguided scale, Little Boy is the rare faith-based film that many viewers may find legitimately offensive." On Metacritic, the film has a score of 30 out of 100, based on 24 critics, indicating "generally unfavorable reviews".

Alan Scherstuhl, writing for The Village Voice, describes Little Boy as a "cynical, poisonous, deeply stupid film." Christy Lemire wrote in RogerEbert.com, "even by this genre's standards, the sentimental way the story twists and ends is as shameless as it is maudlin." Michael Phillips, writing for the Chicago Tribune, criticized the use of the bombing of Japan, and wrote, "Little Boy answers a question most tear-jerkers wouldn't have the nerve to ask: Can the bombing of Hiroshima be manipulated narratively, if briefly, into a position of warming our hearts? The answer is no." Tim Drake of the National Catholic Register said the film "mirrors the Holy Trinity. ... [Jakob] Salvati brings an endearing delight to his role. He is a pleasure to watch. ... The film is a nostalgic parable about faith. Yet it's not what would be described as a faith-based film. Rather, it's a mature story containing Catholic elements. It treats both the faith of Father Oliver and the lack of religious faith of Hashimoto with respect." However, Drake does object to the way in which it treats the atomic bombing of Japan. Kathryn Jean Lopez of the National Review said that the film's message is "subtle and luminous", and the film is "remarkably sweet in the least saccharine but also most humane way... a tender movie that inspires hope." She summarized it as a "heart-wrenching and encouraging movie dealing with life and death, and with faith, hope and love." Adam R. Holz, editor for the  entertainment reviewing arm of Focus On The Family Plugged In, reviews: "Little Boy, then, can certainly serve as a solid (and delightfully entertaining!) launching pad for discussions about what it means to believe, and how we navigate the specifics of why we believe what we believe about miracles and God's sustaining hand in the midst of danger and tragedy. It also powerfully addresses the way we (should) treat those we think are our enemies."

References

External links 

 

2015 films
2015 comedy-drama films
American comedy-drama films
Films about the atomic bombings of Hiroshima and Nagasaki
Films set in 1945
Films set in California
Films set on the home front during World War II
Films shot in Mexico
Open Road Films films
Japan in non-Japanese culture
2010s English-language films
2010s American films